Sher Shah , was the Saint and his tomb on Sher Shah Road. Sher Shah was the famous saint of this area. Due to this the main road of Cantt famous on their name and is located in Multan District in the Punjab province of Pakistan.

Location
It is located at 30°4'0N 71°1'0E. The town is famous because of renowned saint Sher Shah. Sher Shah is famous for its mangoes. An oil depot is also located there

References

Populated places in Multan District